Shpresa is an Albanian female name meaning "hope" (shpresë). People bearing the name Shpresa include:

 Shpresa Kureta, Albanian ambassador to Poland
 Shpresa Lleshaj, member of Swedish pop duo Flora Cash

References

Albanian feminine given names